Lux (Latin, 'light') is the SI derived unit of illuminance, which measures the perceived intensity of light. LUX is a gene involved in the circadian rhythms of Arabidopsis thaliana.

Lux or LUX may also refer to:

Arts and entertainment
 Lux (Brian Eno album), 2012
 Lux (Gemini Syndrome album), 2013
 Lux (video game), 2002
 Lux, King of Criminals, a 1929 German silent film
 LUX Magazine, a fashion magazine by PennWell
 Lux Prize, a European Parliament film prize
 Lux Radio Theatre, a former American long-running radio anthology series
 Lux Style Awards, a Pakistani entertainment industry awards ceremony
 Life Unexpected, an American TV series also known as Lux

Fictional entities
 Lux Cassidy, in the American TV drama Life Unexpected
 Lux, in the novel and film The Virgin Suicides
 Lux Arcadia, in the light novel series Undefeated Bahamut Chronicle
 Lux, Jayne Cobb's gun in the sci-fi TV series Firefly
 Lux, resources in the video game Kingdom Hearts χ
 Lux, champion in the video game League of Legends
Lux, Lucifer Morningstar's nightclub in the urban fantasy TV series Lucifer

Businesses and organisations
 LUX (British film company), for the promotion of experimental film
 Lux Capital, an American venture capital firm
 Lux Film, an Italian film company
 Lux Industries, an Indian underwear company 
 Lux Products, a thermostat brand of Johnson Controls Inc.
 LUX* Resorts & Hotels, a hotel operator based in Mauritius
 Lux (soap), a global brand developed by Unilever
 Lux, Italian stock exchange ticker for Luxottica, an Italian eyewear conglomerate

People
 Adam Lux (1765–1793), German revolutionary
 Danny Lux (born 1969), American composer 
 Gavin Lux (born 1997), American baseball player
 Germán Lux (born 1982), Argentine association footballer
 Gwen Lux (1908–1987), American sculptor
 Josef Lux (1956–1999), Czech politician
 Kazimierz Lux (1780–1846), Polish soldier and pirate
 Loretta Lux (born 1969), German photographer
 Lucien Lux (born 1956), Luxembourgian politician
 Lux Interior (Erick Lee Purkhiser, 1946–2009), American singer
 Mike Lux (born 1960), American political consultant 
 Olivia Lux (born 1994), American drag queen
 Thomas Lux (1946–2017), American poet 
 Vitalij Lux (born 1989), Kyrgyzstani-German footballer
 Matthew David Graham, online pseudonym Lux, child pornographer

Places
 Lux, Côte-d'Or, France
 Lux, Haute-Garonne, France
 Lux, Saône-et-Loire, France
 Luxembourg, a country in western Europe

Science and technology
 Conway's LUX method for magic squares, an algorithm for creating magic squares
 Large Underground Xenon experiment, formerly at the Sanford Underground Research Facility, U.S.
 Lux operon, which controls bioluminescence in luminescent bacteria

Transportation
 Dudek Lux, a Polish paraglider design
 Lux (Lyft), a level of service from ridesharing company Lyft
 Lux, Nevada, train station, U.S.
 LUX, a series of cars by VinFast
 LUX, the IATA code for Luxembourg Airport, the principal airport of Luxembourg
 LUX, the National Rail code for Luxulyan railway station, Cornwall, Uk

Other uses
 Lux, a Danish barley variety
 Lux, German for lynx

See also

 LX (disambiguation)
 Fiat Lux (disambiguation)
 Lux Aeterna (disambiguation)
 Lux Mundi (disambiguation)
 "400 Lux", a song by Lorde on the Pure Heroine album

German-language surnames
Surnames from given names